ERP or Erp may refer to:

Acronyms

Economics
 Effective rate of protection of tariffs
 Equity risk premium, excess return on risky investments
 European Recovery Program or Marshall Plan

Medicine
 Effective refractory period, in a cardiac cycle
 Estrogen receptor positive, a cancer pathology test result
 Event-related potential, a measured brain response
 Exposure and response prevention, a treatment method in behavioral therapy
 OspE/F-like related protein, in Lyme disease microbiology

Other acronyms
 Effective radiated power, of directional radio transmission
 Ejército Revolucionario del Pueblo (disambiguation), (Spanish for People's Revolutionary Army), various Latin American communist or socialist organizations
 Electronic Road Pricing, in Singapore
 Energy-related products, that use or affect energy consumption
 Enterprise resource planning, a business process system

People
 Erp (Pict), father of Drest I of the Picts

Places
 Erp, Ariège, France, a village
 Erp (Germany), a village
 Erp, Netherlands, a town

See also
 Van Erp, a Dutch surname
 D'Erp Castle, Baarlo, Limburg, Netherlands
 Ethernet Ring Protection Switching (ERPS), used in Ethernet networks
 Earp (disambiguation)